George Anderson (12 June 1883 – 31 March 1975) was a British cyclist. He competed in the 660 yards sprint at the 1908 Summer Olympics.

References

External links
 

1883 births
1975 deaths
British male cyclists
Olympic cyclists of Great Britain
Cyclists at the 1908 Summer Olympics
Place of birth missing